Stroud Municipal Airport  is a public use airport in Lincoln County, Oklahoma, United States. It is owned by the City of Stroud and located three nautical miles (6 km) north of its central business district. This airport is included in the National Plan of Integrated Airport Systems for 2011–2015, which categorized it as a general aviation facility.

Facilities and aircraft 
Stroud Municipal Airport covers an area of 180 acres (73 ha) at an elevation of 900 feet (274 m) above mean sea level. It has one runway designated 18/36 with an asphalt surface measuring 3,000 by 60 feet (914 x 18 m). For the 12-month period ending September 20, 2012, the airport had 200 general aviation aircraft operations, an average of 16 per month.

References

External links 
 Stroud Municipal Airport (SUD) at Oklahoma Aeronautics Commission
 Aerial image as of February 1995 from USGS The National Map
 

Airports in Oklahoma
Buildings and structures in Lincoln County, Oklahoma